Harold Nottman (18 February 1917 – 2 August 2008) was a New Zealand cricketer. He played one first-class match for Auckland in 1941/42.

See also
 List of Auckland representative cricketers

References

External links
 

1917 births
2008 deaths
New Zealand cricketers
Auckland cricketers
Cricketers from Rochdale